Dahanu was a Lok Sabha parliamentary constituency of Maharashtra.

Members of Lok Sabha

See also
 Dahanu
 Palghar Lok Sabha constituency
 Bhiwandi Lok Sabha constituency
 List of Constituencies of the Lok Sabha

Former Lok Sabha constituencies of Maharashtra
Former constituencies of the Lok Sabha
2008 disestablishments in India
Constituencies disestablished in 2008